Correbia negrona is a moth of the subfamily Arctiinae. It was described by Max Wilhelm Karl Draudt in 1917. It is found in Ecuador.

References

Euchromiina
Moths described in 1917